WWKY (990 AM) is a radio station broadcasting a Soft AC format. Licensed to Winchester, Kentucky, the station primarily serves Clark County but can be listened to in much of the Bluegrass region of Central Kentucky in the daytime. The station is currently owned by Gateway Radio Works, Inc.

History
The station went on the air as WKPJ on February 5, 1986. On February 21, 1986, the station changed its call sign to WMAK, and on June 24, 1996, changed it again, to WGWM. The station changed its call sign to the current WWKY on May 15, 2017.

Originally licensed to serve London, Kentucky at 980 AM, the station moved to a new transmitter and operating on 990 AM in Winchester effective February 2, 2018.

References

External links
WWKY Official Website

WKY (AM)
Radio stations established in 1982
Soft adult contemporary radio stations in the United States
1982 establishments in Kentucky
Winchester, Kentucky